The Star of Damascus is a 1920 Austrian film directed by Michael Curtiz. It was followed by The Scourge of God.

Cast
 Lucy Doraine
 Iván Petrovich

See also
 Michael Curtiz filmography

External links

Films directed by Michael Curtiz
1920 films
Austrian black-and-white films
Austrian silent feature films